Televisión Independiente de México (Independent Mexican Television, known on air as TIM or Cadena TIM) was a Mexican national television network founded in 1965 by Eugenio Garza Sada. It operated until 1973, when it merged with its primary competitor, Telesistema Mexicano, owned by Emilio Azcárraga Vidaurreta, to form the Televisa conglomerate. Televisa absorbed all of TIM's assets, including its television transmitters and its series, including pioneering programs such as El Chavo del Ocho.

History

1965-68: From Monterrey south
TIM was founded not in Mexico City, which was the largest media market in the country, but in the northern Mexican city of Monterrey, where Garza Sada already owned a brewery (Cervecería Cuauhtémoc, now part of Heineken) and a glass factory, among other assets. The goal of TIM was to provide an alternative to the television stations located in Mexico City, chiefly XEW-TV on channel 2, XHTV-TV on channel 4, and XHGC-TV on channel 5.

In Monterrey TIM received the channel 6 allocation, which it built as XET-TV. It then sought to enter other major Mexican markets before eventually targeting Mexico City, a task that had TIM building stations elsewhere. In Veracruz it built and signed on XHFM-TV channel 2, and in Puebla it created XHP-TV channel 3, placed midway between Veracruz and Mexico City. It was in Puebla that José Ramón Fernández, one of Mexico's pioneering sports journalists, got his start.

TIM finally entered Mexico City in 1967, in time for the 1968 Summer Olympics. In Mexico City, TIM received a concession for channel 8, which was given the callsign XHTM-TV. It built new facilities in the San Ángel neighborhood. TIM's entry into Mexico City put it into direct competition with Telesistema Mexicano, which had just been formed between Azcárraga, XHTV owner Romulo O'Farrill Jr., and the shares of the deceased Guillermo González Camarena (owner of XHGC), for viewers in the nation's capital.

1968-72: At war with Telesistema Mexicano
An intense war broke out between the two giants of Mexican television, the recently formed TIM against Telesistema, who held an iron grip on Mexico City television. During this era TIM produced series such as Los Polivoces, Juan Pirulero and El Chavo del Ocho, originally named after XHTM's channel position.

Merger and legacy
In 1972, Emilio Azcárraga Vidaurreta died. As Garza Sada could not see a way out of the brutal war, he began talking to Azcárraga's heir, Emilio Azcárraga Milmo. Eight months before Garza Sada's death in September 1973, the two merged, forming Televisión via Satélite, S.A. de C.V., a business later known as Televisa.

The XHTM-based television network was slowly dismantled, with the transmitters being used to broadcast Televisa's other national networks.

In 1985, the Mexican government sought to build a channel 7 in Mexico City under the auspices of Imevisión, which was given the callsign XHIMT-TV. In order to facilitate the additional station, a frequency and callsign change was conducted involving XHTM and Televisa's XEQ-TV channel 9 in Puebla. The end result was that the Mexico City station became XEQ-TV, channel 9. Meanwhile, XEX-TV channel 7 moved to channel 8, while the Puebla XEQ became XHTM-TV, a rebroadcaster of XEW-TV located on channel 10. XEQ was primarily available in Mexico City until Televisa received approval in 1993 to extend its reach with 62 new transmitters.

Significant competition in Mexican television would not return until the 1990s and the privatization of Imevisión into a new company, Televisión Azteca, which inherited Imevisión's channels 7 and 13.

1965 establishments in Mexico
Television networks in Mexico
Televisa
1973 disestablishments in Mexico